The 2017 Hamilton Tiger-Cats season was the 60th season for the team in the Canadian Football League and their 68th overall. The Tiger-Cats finished the season in 3rd place in the East Division with a 6–12 record and missed the playoffs for the first time since 2012. After a loss to the Calgary Stampeders on October 13, 2017, followed by an Ottawa Redblacks win later that night, the Tiger-Cats were eliminated from post-season contention.

This was the second season under general manager Eric Tillman and fifth under head coach Kent Austin. After starting the season 0–8, Austin resigned from the head coach position on August 24, giving the post to June Jones, whom Austin had hired initially as assistant head coach three weeks prior. Jones then hired Art Briles as his assistant head coach; within hours, the CFL's league office blocked the hire over Briles' alleged involvement in the Baylor University sexual assault scandal. Jones would finish the season 6–4 and remain head coach for the 2018 season.

Offseason

Negotiation List 
On March 31, 2017 the Tiger-Cats announced they would be the first CFL team in history to publicly announce the players on their negotiation list. Three players will be announced in each segment of Ticats All Access (a free subscription program); among the first three revealed was former Heisman-winning quarterback Johnny Manziel, who did not sign with the team in 2017 but would join the team in 2018.

CFL draft 
The 2017 CFL Draft took place on May 7, 2017. The Tiger-Cats had seven selections in the eight-round draft after trading their fourth round pick and two players for Justin Capicciotti and Xavier Fulton.

Preseason

Regular season

Season Standings

Season Schedule

Team

Roster

Coaching staff

References

Hamilton Tiger-Cats seasons
2017 Canadian Football League season by team
2017 in Ontario